The Ministry for the Development of the Russian Far East and Arctic is a ministry of the Government of Russia responsible for the economic and social development of the Russian Far East and Russian Arctic.

The Ministry for Development of the Russian Far East and Arctic was established on 21 May 2012 by the First Medvedev Cabinet. It was known as the Ministry for Development of the Russian Far East until 26 February 2019.

Aleksey Chekunkov has served as the Minister of the Development of the Russian Far East and Arctic since 10 November 2020.

List of Ministers of the Development of the Russian Far East and Arctic
Viktor Ishayev (21 May 2012 – 31 August 2013)
Alexander Galushka (31 August 2013 – 7 May 2018)
Alexander Kozlov (18 May 2018 – 10 November 2020)
Aleksey Chekunkov (10 November 2020 – present)

Notes

References

External links
  

Federal ministries of Russia
Russian Far East
Indigenous affairs ministries